Colin Connor (born 25 September 1969 in Belfast, Northern Ireland) is a professional actor, comedian and writer.

Colin made his acting debut in 1985 in the feature film The End of the World Man, and went on to star in Danny Boyle's 1987 television feature Scout.

Colin trained at the Manchester School of Theatre and has subsequently appeared in the television productions See No Evil: The Moors Murders, The Royal and The Underground.

He has also had recurring soap roles as Gary McFarlane in Emmerdale, Father Raymond in Hollyoaks and DC Tandy in Coronation Street.

His debut play, Meanwhile received the Forever Manchester Award at the 2009 Not Part Of festival, which also featured his autobiographical comedy performance Standing Up and Coming Out at 40.

References

External links
 

1969 births
21st-century writers from Northern Ireland
Comedians from Belfast
Living people
Male actors from Belfast
Male comedians from Northern Ireland
Male film actors from Northern Ireland
Male television actors from Northern Ireland
Male writers from Northern Ireland
Television writers from Northern Ireland
Writers from Belfast
British male television writers
21st-century comedians from Northern Ireland
21st-century British screenwriters